The First National Bank in Gary, South Dakota is a building on South Dakota Highway 22 which was built in 1917.  It was listed on the National Register of Historic Places in 1977.

It was deemed significant as "the only Neo-Classical Revival style commercial building in Gary. In addition to its singular quality, the structure is also a good example of South Dakota's work with the Neo-Classical Revival on a very small scale."

It is a one-story building constructed of cut limestone.  Its facade includes two pilasters with Doric capitals, and modillions below the cornice.

It served as a bank from 1917 until the Great Depression.

References

Bank buildings on the National Register of Historic Places in South Dakota
Neoclassical architecture in South Dakota
Buildings and structures completed in 1917
Deuel County, South Dakota